Cobblebank railway station is located on the Serviceton line in Victoria, Australia. It serves the western Melbourne suburb of Cobblebank, and opened on 1 December 2019.

History
Rail Motor Stopping Place No. 65 opened on 1 October 1934, and was at the approximate location of the present Cobblebank station. By 4 November 1968, it had been removed from the Victorian Railways working timetables and, on 8 July 1969, it was closed to traffic.

In November 2017, the Victorian State Government announced the station would be built, with a scheduled completion date of late 2019. The station, built as part of the Regional Rail Revival project, was provided to serve future residential developments nearby.

On 26 October 2018, the designs for the station were released and, at the same time, it was renamed from Toolern to Cobblebank. Despite that, it still uses the station code for Toolern (TLN).

On 1 December 2019, the station opened, with around 1000 community members attending the opening celebration. The station opening coincided with the duplication of 18km of track between Deer Park West and Melton.

First announced by the Andrews State Government in 2018, the station will eventually be integrated into the metropolitan railway network, as part of the Western Rail Plan.

Platforms, facilities and services
Cobblebank has two side platforms. The station has a ticketing office, an office and holding cell for Protective Services Officers, a waiting room, male, female and accessible toilets, a Parkiteer bicycle parking cage, an accessible pedestrian overpass with lifts, ramps and stairs, and bus and car parking. The station has provision for two express railway tracks, which will most likely be laid after electrification works to Melton are complete.

It is served by V/Line Ballarat and Ararat line trains.

Platform 1:
  services to Southern Cross
  services to Southern Cross

Platform 2:
  services to Melton, Bacchus Marsh and Wendouree
  services to Ararat

Transport Links
Transit Systems Victoria operates one route to and from Cobblebank station, under contract to Public Transport Victoria:
 : to Melton station

Gallery

References

Railway stations in Melbourne
Railway stations in Australia opened in 2019
Railway stations in the City of Melton